American singer-songwriter Gregory Porter has released six studio albums, one collaborative album, two compilation albums, two live albums, one EP, and 18 singles.

Albums

Studio albums

Collaborative albums

Compilation albums

Live albums

EPs

Singles

As lead artist

As featured artist

Promotional singles

Guest appearances

References

Discographies of American artists